Sandra de las Mercedes Ruales Mosquera (born May 30, 1974 in Quito, Pichincha) is an Ecuadorian long-distance runner.

She twice competed for her native country at the Summer Olympics: 2004 and 2008. Ruales won the 2005, 2006, 2008 and 2009 edition of the Guayaquil Marathon.

International competitions

References

sports-reference

1974 births
Living people
Sportspeople from Quito
Ecuadorian female marathon runners
Ecuadorian female long-distance runners
Olympic athletes of Ecuador
Athletes (track and field) at the 2004 Summer Olympics
Athletes (track and field) at the 2008 Summer Olympics
World Athletics Championships athletes for Ecuador
21st-century Ecuadorian women